Inscriptional Parthian is a Unicode block containing characters of the script used under the Sassanid Empire.

History
The following Unicode-related documents record the purpose and process of defining specific characters in the Inscriptional Parthian block:

References 

Unicode blocks
Parthian language